Cirebon Prujakan Station is a railway station in Cirebon, West Java, Indonesia.

The station is located at a height of 4 metres above sea level is located at Nyimas Gandasari Street, Pekalangan, Pekalipan, Cirebon. Cirebon Prujakan Station is the largest station on DAOP 3 Cirebon after Cirebon Station and Jatibarang Station.

Cirebon Prujakan Station is a train station stops for economy class train. While the executive and business class train does not stop at this station but stops at Cirebon Station, although sometimes there is also a stop on Cirebon Prujakan to cross, because the line was still using a single track to track eastward. This station is the only railway station in DAOP 3 Cirebon that have drive thru ticketing system since 2011.

In 2011, Cirebon Prujakan Station and Cirebon station was renovated by elevating platform, and added lines.

History 
The station was built almost simultaneously with Cirebon Station, which is about on 1911 the initiative of the private railway company, Semarang-Cheribonsche-Stoomtram-Maatschappij (SCS). As a container station and freight trains, station construction is intended to facilitate and accelerate the flow of agricultural commodities and imported goods mobility. The flow of goods from this station next empties in Cirebon port, because the station is the formerly station branching line to the port of. 
Since July 2011, the station Cirebon Prujakan transformed into a big station intended as the economy class train stops in the city of Cirebon on the north and south line. So the station is a station branching for the Northern line and south line that were previously located in Cirebon station.

Services 
The following is a list of train services at the Cirebon Prujakan Station
 Jaka Tingkir to Pasar Senen and 
 Kaligung to

References

External links
 

Buildings and structures in Cirebon
Railway stations in West Java
Railway stations opened in 1897